Reedness Junction railway station was a railway junction near Reedness, East Riding of Yorkshire, England on the Axholme Joint Railway. Immediately to the west of the station, the Fockerby Branch, which continued eastwards, turned off from the main line to Epworth, which curved to the south.

History
The Goole and Marshland Light Railway was one of the early lines to be authorised under the Light Railway Act of 1896, which was designed to ease the problems facing the building of rural railways.

Both railways negotiated with the North Eastern Railway in January 1900, and the larger company agreed to take over the lines. The station was opened for goods traffic on 8 January 1900. A Directors' train, consisting of a contractor's engine and two open trucks, ran on 26 June 1900, and included a trial run to Crowle over the Isle of Axholme Light Railway line. Another inspection, on behalf of the North Eastern Railway before purchasing the line, passed through the station and along the Fockerby Branch to Luddington, as the final section to Garthorpe, later renamed as Fockerby station, had not been completed. Eastoft station was noted to be complete, and the inspector expected Reedness Junction, Luddington and Garthorpe to be finished to a similar standard.

The inspector recommended that a  water tank should be installed at Reedness, with a petroleum gas-engine capable of filling it in two hours, and two water columns, one to fill locomotives on the main line and another in the sidings. He also noted that there was no signalling, but he expected the company to install such equipment as the Board of Trade required.

When the takeover of both lines occurred at the beginning of 1903, the North Eastern Railway was acting jointly with the Lancashire and Yorkshire Railway, and the line became the Axholme Joint Railway, although its official title from 17 February 1904 was the Isle of Axholme Joint Railway (NE and L&Y Joint). The Goole and Marshland line and the Isle of Axholme Light Railway line from Reedness to Crowle were opened for passengers and goods traffic on 10 August 1903, with the line southwards to Haxey Junction following in January 1905, once it was completed.

As built, the junction was to the west of the station, which had two platforms, one on the main line and another on the Fockerby Branch. There were sidings to the north of the single lines, accessible from the Fockerby Branch, and a loop just beyond the sidings. The station master's house was situated between the two lines, and there were wooden buildings used as a signal cabin and a ticket office. A water tank supported by a tall brick tower was located to the north of the sidings. It fed three water columns, and was supplied by a pumping station at Shipcote Drain,  from the station. A second tank was erected near the pumping station, but after consideration, the cost of replacing the pipe with a  one was not thought to be justified.

The railway company held a heated debate in 1906, when Colonel Thompson requested permission for a group of about 16 female potato pickers to be allowed to walk from the station through Reedness Goods Yard, and then cross over Swinefleet Warping Drain by walking along the main line of the railway. His request was to reduce the distance that the ladies had to walk to work each day, and was granted, although the Colonel had to indemnify the railway against claims if any of them were involved in an accident while following this route.

There is some doubt as to the name of the station, as the Railway Clearing House map and some tickets showed it as Reedness, while NER promotional materials and other tickets showed it as Reedness Jct. There is no evidence for a station nameboard, and consequently no photographic evidence either.

The station closed after the last passenger service on 15 July 1933. The line through the station remained open for goods traffic until 1965. 
Despite its name, the junction and station were in the adjacent parish of Swinefleet, although both the Fockerby Branch and the main line to Epworth passed through the parish of Reedness to the east of the station.

Bibliography

References

Disused railway stations in the East Riding of Yorkshire
Former Axholme Joint Railway stations
Railway stations in Great Britain opened in 1903
Railway stations in Great Britain closed in 1933